John C. Donnelly (1839–1895) was a Union Navy sailor in the American Civil War and a recipient of the U.S. military's highest decoration, the Medal of Honor, for his actions at the Battle of Mobile Bay.

Born in 1839 in England, Donnelly immigrated to the United States and was living in New York when he joined the U.S. Navy. Despite intense fire, the boat crew was able to pull ten Tecumseh men from the water. For this action, Donnelly was awarded the Medal of Honor a year and a half later, on January 15, 1866. Five other members of the boat crew also received the medal: Seaman James Avery, Quarter Gunner Charles Baker, Captain of the Forecastle John Harris, Seaman Henry Johnson, and Landsman Daniel Noble.

Donnelly's official Medal of Honor citation reads:
Served on board the U.S.S. Metacomet. As a member of the boat's crew which went to the rescue of the U.S. Monitor Tecumseh when that vessel was struck by a torpedo in passing the enemy forts in Mobile Bay, 5 August 1864, Donnelly braved the enemy fire which was said by the admiral [ David Farragut ] to be "one of the most galling" he had ever seen and aided in rescuing from death 10 of the crew of the Tecumseh, eliciting the admiration of both friend and foe.

Donnelly died in 1895 at age 55 or 56.

References

External links 
 

1839 births
1895 deaths
British emigrants to the United States
People of New York (state) in the American Civil War
Union Navy sailors
United States Navy Medal of Honor recipients
English-born Medal of Honor recipients
American Civil War recipients of the Medal of Honor